Joy M. Bergelson is an American evolutionary biologist. She is currently the Dorothy Schiff Professor of Genomics at New York University. Bergelson was previously and James D. Watson Distinguished Service Professor of Ecology and Evolution at the University of Chicago, where she chaired the department for ecology and evolution. Her research focuses on the evolution and ecology of plants.

Education and career 
Born in Brooklyn and raised in Metuchen, New Jersey, Bergelson graduated in 1980 from Metuchen High School, which inducted her into its hall of fame in 2017.

Bergelson graduated from Brown University with an ScB in Biology in 1984. She went on to further study as a Marshall Scholar at the University of York, receiving an MPhil in Biology in 1986 and a PhD in Zoology from the University of Washington in 1990. Bergelson worked as a demonstrator in Ecology at the University of Oxford, before joining the faculty of the Washington University in St. Louis in 1992. She left St. Louis for Chicago in 1994.

She served as the section chair for Biology of the American Association for the Advancement of Science in 2012.

Research 
Bergelson is known for her research on the model plant species Arabidopsis thaliana, its ecology and the evolution of plant-pathogen interactions. Her early research examined interactions between insects and trees, spatial patterns in trees and weeds, and the energetic cost to plants to resist insects. Subsequently she examined genetic variation in Arabidopsis thaliana, the genetic basis for disease resistance in plants, and polymorphisms in Arabidopsis. Bergelson's research has also examined genetic adaptations in plants to recent climate change.

Selected publications

Honors and awards 
 Elected fellow of the American Association for the Advancement of Science in 2004
 Elected fellow of the National Academy of Sciences in 2018
 Elected fellow of the American Academy of Arts and Sciences in 2020

References

External links 
 

Alumni of the University of York
20th-century American biologists
21st-century American biologists
Fellows of the American Academy of Arts and Sciences
Fellows of the American Association for the Advancement of Science
Metuchen High School alumni
New York University faculty
People from Metuchen, New Jersey
Scientists from New Jersey
University of Chicago faculty
Brown University alumni
University of Washington alumni
Marshall Scholars
American women biologists
Evolutionary biologists
Members of the United States National Academy of Sciences
Women evolutionary biologists
Washington University in St. Louis faculty
Living people
Year of birth missing (living people)
Place of birth missing (living people)
21st-century American women